Sir George Monoux College is a sixth form college located in Walthamstow, London. It is a medium-sized college with around 1,620 full-time students as of 2018.

Brief history
Sir George Monoux, the founder of the Grammar School (later College), was born in or before 1465. In 1506 he was a Warden of the Drapers Company, in 1509 he became the Sheriff of London and later in 1514 he became Lord Mayor. Sir George Monoux was elected to Parliament as a Burgess for the City in 1523. He was a wealthy man who spent much of his time in Walthamstow.

George Monoux (alderman of London and local worthy) erected the Almshouses, associated school and feast ball for the poor of Walthamstow on a former parcel of St. Mary's Churchyard in 1527 in Walthamstow Village.

The Monoux School operated there for 353 years until moving firstly to West Avenue then to High Street, and finally to Chingford Road in 1927. The western end was rebuilt in 1955 following bombing in October 1940.

From 1527 to 1999 the school underwent many changes. From 1659 to 1968 it operated as a grammar school for boys. From 1968 to 1986 the school was a comprehensive. In 1986 the school became a sixth form college and girls were admitted for the first time. Following the 1992 Further and Higher Education Act, in 1993, Monoux became an Incorporated College, which it remains today.

Sir George Monoux Grammar School 1885-1968 
The school was re-established following a scheme made under the Endowed Schools Act in 1885 in a different part of Walthamstow, temporary premises in West Avenue, and then a purpose-built site in High Street. It moved to the present premises in July 1927. There have been many additions to the buildings since then. In 1961, 1977, 1990, 2002 and 2004.
The school remained independent, but came increasingly to depend on local authority grants. From the death of the headmaster, William Spivey, in 1916, it can be regarded as effectively a local authority grammar school.
The school was a selective boys grammar school until 1968 catering for boys aged 11–18.

Following reorganisation of secondary education by Waltham Forest council (devised by a Labour council but instituted under a Conservative one), during the years 1968 - 72 it gradually became a comprehensive Senior High School for boys aged 14–18 admitting most of its pupils from the Junior High Schools Chapel End, William Fitt, Warwick Boys School and Aveling Park. The last entry of boys to the main Monoux building was in 1987 who were taught separately to the sixth form but within the same building in Chingford Road. The last entry of boys however was in 1988 who were not taught in the main building but in an "annexe" located in Brookscroft Rd in the old Chapel End Junior High School. This was closed in 1990.

Sir George Monoux Sixth Form College 1986-
Following the London Borough of Waltham Forest's re-organisation of post-16 studies, in 1986 the school became a co educational sixth form college for students aged 16–19 and fully co-educational from 1989. It was funded and administered by the borough from 1986 to 1993 when under the provisions of the Further and Higher Education Act 1992 it was incorporated, becoming in effect an independent body funded by the newly formed Further Education Funding Council for England (FEFC).

In 2001 the FEFC was replaced with the Learning and Skills Council (LSC). The college driven by government growth targets increased in size from 600 students in 1986 to approximately 2000 students in 2006. The college offers A-level and vocational courses. The college draws students from a wide geographical area of north and east London and from a very wide range of cultural and ethnic backgrounds. At present over 95% of the students are from minority ethnic communities.

The Principals
Since 1986 the Principals of the college have been:

Mrs Corine Moffett 1986-1993
Arthur Harvey 1993-1996
Stephen Grix 1996-2000
John McMinn, Acting Principal April–September 2000
Richard Chambers 2000-2006
John McMinn, Acting Principal November–March 2006
Kim Clifford 2006-2010
Paolo Ramella 2010-2015
David Vasse 2016 - current

Notable former students

 Gabrielle Brooks, actress
 Redzz Rapper, singer, songwriter, producer and actor
 June Sarpong, TV presenter
 Chijindu Ujah, Athlete

Sir George Monoux Grammar School
 Robert Barltrop, prolific local writer, attended Monoux from 1933 to 1938
 Prof George Barnard, Professor of Mathematics at the University of Essex from 1966–75, and President of the Royal Statistical Society from 1971-2, the Operational Research Society from 1962-4 and the Institute of Mathematics and its Applications from 1970-1
 Edward Lyon Berthon marine inventor, who attended the original school, c1830
 Sir Reader Bullard
 Gary Carpenter (composer) attended Monoux 1962 to 1969.
 Sir Jack Cater CBE, Chief Secretary of Hong Kong from 1978–81
 Thomas George Cowling, Professor of Applied Mathematics at the University of Leeds from 1948–70, and President of the Royal Astronomical Society from 1965-7
 Sir John Dankworth, jazz musician, attended Monoux from 1937 to 1944
 Sir John Elvidge, Permanent Secretary to the Scottish Executive 2003-2010
 Prof Sir Alan Fersht, Herchel Smith Professor of Organic Chemistry at the University of Cambridge, elected in 2012 to become the Master of Gonville and Caius College, Cambridge.
 John Garrett, Labour MP for Norwich South from 1974–83 and 1987–97
 Professor Norman Gowar Professor of Mathematics at the Open University and Principal of Royal Holloway College, University of London
 John Horner, Labour MP for Oldbury and Halesowen from 1964–70
 James Hilton, novelist, at school 1909-15 
 Doug Insole, who played for England's cricket team, attended Monoux from 1937 to 1944
 Sir Barry Jackson, surgeon, and President of the Royal Society of Medicine from 2002-4, the Royal College of Surgeons of England from 1998-2001, and of the British Academy of Forensic Science from 2005-7
 Jim Lewis, footballer
 Prof Donald Northcote, Professor of Plant Biochemistry at the University of Cambridge from 1972–89, who first discovered the preprophase band in 1966
 Michael Nyman, composer and musicologist
 Dr Christopher Page, writer on medieval music
 Norman Pannell, Conservative MP for Liverpool Kirkdale from 1955–64
 Chris Pond (born 1949), from 1961 to 1969, founding head of the House of Commons Information Office, author and historian, wrote the history of the school in 1977 and updated it in 2002
 Sir Fred Pontin, founder and managing director of Pontins holiday camps, attended Monoux between 1918 and 1922
 Sir John Pritchard CBE, conductor, Chief conductor of the BBC Symphony Orchestra from 1982-9
 Barry Rose OBE, conductor and organist of Guildford Cathedral from 1960–74
 Air Vice-Marshal Roy Scoggins CBE, Director of RAF Dental Services from 1958–64
 Jamie Shea, NATO spokesman, much in the news during the Kosovo crisis, attended Monoux from 1965 to 1972
 Frederick Silvester, Conservative MP for Walthamstow West from 1967–70 and Manchester Withington from 1974–87
 John Smith, is an avant–garde filmmaker noted for his use of humour, attended Monoux from 1963 to 1968
 Matthew Bourne choreographer, 1974-1978
 Prof Herman Waldmann, Professor of Pathology at the University of Oxford since 1994

Sir George Monoux Senior High School
 Teddy Sheringham, former star of Manchester United and Tottenham Hotspur Football Club, attended Monoux in the 1970s, leaving in 1982.
Brian Harvey from the pop band East 17 attended until 1990.
Seyi Akiwowo, political and social activist

Sir George Monoux College
CJ Ujah, athlete

References

External links
Sir George Monoux College website
Sir George Monoux VLE
School history
Old Monovians
Monovian extracts
BBC stats page

Sixth form colleges in London
Education in the London Borough of Waltham Forest
Walthamstow